Soumendu Roy (born 1933) is an Indian cinematographer most known for his work with noted director Satyajit Ray's films, starting with Teen Kanya (1961), when Subrata Mitra developed an eye-problem, though he has earlier shot Ray's documentary Rabindranath Tagore (1961) and has been an assistant to Subrata in post Pather Panchali films.

Career
Starting as a handler of trolley and lighting in early Ray film, Roy went on to work on 21 of Ray's films including 15 features, Golden Bear winning film, Ashani Sanket (1973) and Aranyer Din Ratri (1969). He also worked with directors, Tapan Sinha, Tarun Majumdar, Buddhadeb Dasgupta and MS Sathyu.

In his long career, Roy won the National Film Award for Best Cinematography three times, plus one Best Non-Feature Film Cinematography award for documentary film, Suchitra Mitra in 1993, directed by Raja Sen.

In 2006, a 30-minute documentary on him, "Portrait of a Cinematographer", was screened at the International Film Festival of India (IFFI) in Goa, directed by Papia Roy, and subsequently, Soumendu Ray, a 70 min. documentary by Arindam Saha Sardar
Now Roy is advisor of cinematography department of "ROOPKALA KENDRO" an indo Italian film institute under the information and cultural ministry of government of west Bengal.

Filmography
 Rabindranath Tagore (1961)
 Teen Kanya (1961)
 Abhijaan (1962)
 Palatak (1963)
 Two (Short Film)(1964)
 Alor Pipasha  (1965)  
 Abhoya O Srikanta  (1965)
 Baksabadal  (1965)
 Mahapurush (1965)
 Kapurush (1965)
 Ektuku Basa (1965)
 Chiriyakhana (1967)
 Balika Badhu (1967 film)
 Badhubaran (1967 film)
 Goopy Gyne Bagha Byne (1969) 
 Aranyer Din Ratri (1970)
 Pratidwandi (1970)
 Kuheli (1971)
 Sikkim (1971)
 Seemabaddha (1971)
 The Inner Eye (1972)
 Ashani Sanket (1973)
 Sadhu Judhishthirer Karcha (1974)
 Sonar Kella(1974)
 Jana Aranya(1976)
 Nidhiram Sardar(1976)
 Shatranj Ke Khilari (1977)
 Joybaba Felunath (1979)
 Heerak Rajar Deshe (1980)
 Bala (Short Film)
 Sadgati (1981) (Tele Film)
 Kann Sivanthaal Mann Sivakkum (1982)
 Phatik Chand (1983)
 Piku (Short Film )(1983)
 Islam In India(Documentary) 
 Ghare Baire (1985)
 Sundarban (Documentary)(1985)
 Bhombal Sardar (Short Film)(1988)
 Agun(1988)
 Debata (1990)
 Wiil To Live(English) 
 Anokha Moti
 Ek Doctor Ki Maut (1991)
 Antardhyan (1992)
 Potli Baba Ki (1991) (TV series)
 Charachar (1993) 
 Wheelchair(1994)
 Satabdirkanya
 Ajab Gayer Ajab Katha (1998)

Awards
 National Film Award
 1974: Best Cinematography: Ashani Sanket
 1975: Best Cinematography: Sonar Kella
 1978: Best Cinematography: Shatranj Ke Khiladi
 1993: Best Non-Feature Film Cinematography : Sucitra Mitra
 Tamil Nadu State Film Awards
 1982: Best Cinematographer: Kann Sivanthaal Mann Sivakkum

References

External links
 
 
 Soumendu Roy Interview

Bengali film cinematographers
1933 births
Living people
Artists from Kolkata
Best Cinematography National Film Award winners
University of Calcutta alumni
Satyajit Ray
Tamil Nadu State Film Awards winners
Date of birth missing (living people)
Place of birth missing (living people)
20th-century Indian photographers
Cinematographers from West Bengal